Murray Hamilton (March 24, 1923 – September 1, 1986) was an American stage, screen, and television character actor who appeared in such films as Anatomy of a Murder, The Hustler, The Graduate, Jaws and The Amityville Horror.

Early life
Born in Washington, North Carolina, Hamilton displayed an early interest in performing during his days at Washington High School just before America's entry into World War II. Bad hearing kept him from enlisting, so he moved to New York City as a 19-year-old to find a career on stage.

Career
In an early role, he performed on stage with Henry Fonda in the classic wartime story Mister Roberts as a replacement for David Wayne, playing Ensign Pulver. In 1960, he was  onstage again with Fonda in Critic's Choice; Howard Taubman of The New York Times called him "properly obnoxious as the director". Hamilton was teamed once more with Fonda in 1968 for the drama film The Boston Strangler.

His best known performance is as Larry Vaughn, the obdurate mayor of Amity,  in the Steven Spielberg thriller Jaws (1975). Hamilton reprised the role in the sequel, Jaws 2 in 1978. He was approached to reprise his role in Jaws: The Revenge, but died in 1986 aged 63 . Other notable big-screen appearances include the critically acclaimed 1959 film Anatomy of a Murder with James Stewart, in which he played the bartender Al Pacquette, who gives testimony in the murder of Barney Quill. He also worked with Stewart in The Spirit of St. Louis (1957) and The FBI Story (1959).

The actor made dozens of TV guest appearances. In 1955, Hamilton guest-starred on the NBC legal drama Justice, based on case files of the Legal Aid Society of New York. Hamilton appeared in the Perry Mason episode "The Case of the Deadly Double" (air date March 1, 1958) as the shadowy boyfriend of a woman with a split personality who is the sister of Perry Mason's client.

In 1957 he was a primary star on Gunsmoke, playing a conniving cowboy who sets up Chester for a murder rap as “Jake Buley” in the episode “Chester’s Murder” (S2E27).  In 1959, he appeared in a few episodes of the crime drama The Untouchables, as well as co-starring in the second episode of Rod Serling's television series The Twilight Zone, "One for the Angels", playing Mr. Death opposite Ed Wynn. Also, Hamilton portrayed Calhoun, on (S4E9) of Gunsmoke, which aired in April, 1959.  His character is swindled in a land deal along with other members of a wagon train & his wife tries to leave Calhoun with the swindler.

In the 1959-60 television season, Hamilton also co-starred with William Demarest, Jeanne Bal, and Stubby Kaye in the NBC sitcom Love and Marriage. He played attorney Steve Baker, who resides in an apartment with his wife (played by Bal), two daughters and a father-in-law (portrayed by Demarest). He soon appeared as a guest star on another sitcom, The Real McCoys, starring Walter Brennan, on ABC. In 1961, he appeared in another science fiction series, 'Way Out, hosted by Roald Dahl, with fellow guest stars Doris Roberts and Martin Huston. He guest-starred in an episode of the James Stewart legal drama Hawkins in 1973. In 1986, he played Curtis "Big Daddy" Hollingsworth, Blanche Devereaux's father, in a first-season episode of The Golden Girls.

Hamilton complained in a newspaper article about being typecast, stating "After I was first cast as a heavy on The Untouchables, I couldn't ever persuade them [producers] that I could also do something else." While comic roles were rare for Hamilton during his Hollywood career,  he had one opposite Andy Griffith in the 1958 military comedy No Time for Sergeants, as well as an appearance in Steven Spielberg's raucous comedy 1941, released in 1979. He also appeared in a comedic guest spot on  Mama's Family  in the second-season episode, "Mama Cries Uncle", as Uncle Roy. He was more often cast in dramatic works, such as the stark science-fiction drama Seconds (1966), which starred Rock Hudson. In two of his most distinctive performances, Hamilton appeared with Paul Newman in The Hustler (1961), playing Findley, a wealthy billiards player who gambles for high stakes, and with Dustin Hoffman in The Graduate (1967) as Mr. Robinson, husband of the seductress Mrs. Robinson. In 1975, Hamilton appeared again with Newman in The Drowning Pool. He also worked with Robert Redford in a pair of films, The Way We Were (1973) and Brubaker (1980). In early 1982 he appeared as a judge presiding over an impromptu court case on an episode of Bret Maverick.

For many years both before and during his film career, Hamilton was a prominent dramatic stage actor, earning a Tony Award nomination for his role in the 1965 production of Absence of a Cello. New York Times theater critic Brooks Atkinson praised his work in the play Stockade, which was based on a part of the James Jones novel From Here to Eternity: "Murray Hamilton is an ideal Prewitt. Modest in manner, pleasant of voice, he has a steel-like spirit that brings Prewitt honestly to life."  When the actor was suffering from cancer and found film roles harder to come by, his old co-star George C. Scott helped out by getting him a part in the made-for-television movie The Last Days of Patton (1986).

Death
Hamilton died of lung cancer at age 63, and is interred at Oakdale Cemetery in his native Washington, North Carolina. He and his wife, Terri DeMarco Hamilton (of The DeMarco Sisters fame), had a son, David.

Filmography

 1944 Song of the Open Road as Crop Corps Kid (uncredited)
 1944 Reckless Age as Member of Soldier Quartet
 1944 Something for the Boys as Soldier (uncredited)
 1951 Bright Victory as Pete Hamilton 
 1951 The Whistle at Eaton Falls as Al Webster
 1956 Toward the Unknown as Major Bromo Lee
 1956 The Girl He Left Behind as Sergeant Clyde
 1957 The Spirit of St. Louis as Bud Gurney
 1957 Jeanne Eagels as Chick O'Hara
 1958 Darby's Rangers as Private / Sergeant Sims Delancey
 1958 Too Much, Too Soon as Charlie Snow
 1958 No Time for Sergeants as Irving S. Blanchard
 1958 Perry Mason as Johnny Hale
 1958 Houseboat as Captain Alan Wilson
 1959 Anatomy of a Murder as Alphonse Paquette
 1959 The FBI Story as Sam Crandall
 1960 Tall Story as Coach Sandy Hardy
 1960 Escape to Sonoita as Marsh
 1961 The Hustler as Findley
 1962 The Farmer's Daughter (TV movie) as Nordick
 1963 Papa's Delicate Condition as Mr. Harvey
 1963 13 Frightened Girls as Wally Sanders
 1963 The Cardinal as Lafe
 1965 Inherit the Wind (TV movie) as E.K. Hornbeck
 1966 Seconds as Charlie
 1966 An American Dream as Arthur Kabot
 1966 The Fugitive as Joe Steelman
 1967 A Bell for Adano (TV movie) as Sergeant Leonard Borth
 1967 The Graduate as Mr. Robinson
 1968 Sergeant Ryker as Captain Appleton
 1968 No Way to Treat a Lady as Inspector Haines
 1968 The Boston Strangler as Detective Frank McAfee
 1968 The Brotherhood as Jim Egan
 1969 If It's Tuesday, This Must Be Belgium as Fred Ferguson
 1971 Vanished (TV movie) as Nick McCann
 1971 Cannon (TV movie) as Virgil Holley
 1971 A Tattered Web (TV movie) as Sergeant Joe Marcus
 1971 The Police (TV movie) as Chief of Police
 1971 The Harness (TV movie) as Roy Kern
 1971 The Failing of Raymond (TV movie) as Sergeant Manzak
 1972 Deadly Harvest (TV movie) as Sheriff Bill Jessup
 1973 Incident on a Dark Street (TV movie) as Edmund Schilling
 1973 Murdock's Gang (TV movie) as Harold Talbot
 1973 The Way We Were as Brooks Carpenter
 1974 After the Fall (TV movie) as Mickey
 1975 Jaws as Mayor Larry Vaughn
 1975 The Drowning Pool as Kilbourne
 1977 Murder at the World Series (TV movie) as Harvey Murkison
 1977 Damnation Alley as General Landers (uncredited)
 1977 Killer on Board (TV movie) as Dr. Folger
 1978 Casey's Shadow as Tom Patterson
 1978 Jaws 2 as Mayor Larry Vaughn
 1979 Donovan's Kid (TV movie) as Henry Carpenter
 1979 A Last Cry for Help (TV movie) as Ralph Muir
 1979 The Amityville Horror as Father Ryan
 1979 1941 as Claude Crumn
 1980 Swan Song (TV movie) as Jack McCauley
 1980 Brubaker as John Deach
 1981 All the Way Home (TV movie) as Joel Lynch
 1981 B. J. and the Bear as Captain Rutherford T. Grant  
 1982 Mazes and Monsters (TV movie) as Lieutenant Martini
 1983 Hysterical as The Mayor
 1983 Summer Girl (TV movie) as Jack Reardon
 1984 Boys in Blue (TV movie) as Captain Sid Bender 
 1984 Mama's Family as Uncle Roy Harper
 1985 Too Scared to Scream as Jack
 1986 The Last Days of Patton (TV movie) as General Hobart "Hap" Gay
 1986 Blacke's Magic as Ben McGuire
 1986 The Golden Girls as Curtis "Big Daddy" Hollingsworth
 1986 Whoops Apocalypse as Jack "Kill The Commies" Preston

References

External links

 
 
 
 

1923 births
1986 deaths
20th-century American male actors
American male film actors
American male stage actors
American male television actors
Deaths from cancer in North Carolina
Deaths from lung cancer
Male actors from North Carolina
People from Washington, North Carolina